Irish Birds is the annual journal of BirdWatch Ireland. Its first issue was published in 1977, superseding the Irish Bird Report, which had been published from 1953 (number 1) to 1975 (number 23). Irish Birds publishes papers and notes on all aspects of birds in Ireland, as well as incorporating the annual Irish Bird Report and Irish Ringing Report.

The founding editor of Irish Birds was Clive Hutchinson (1977-1984). Subsequent editors have been Hugh Brazier (1985-1996), Brendan Kavanagh (1997-2000), Stephen Newton (2001-2008), Pat Smiddy (2009-2017) and Barry McMahon (2018-present).

References

See also 
 List of ornithology journals
 List of birds of Ireland

Journals and magazines relating to birding and ornithology
Magazines established in 1977
English-language magazines
Annual magazines